Béréni-Dialla (also known as Béréni-Marbana) is a village in western Ivory Coast. It is in the sub-prefecture of Sifié, Séguéla Department, Worodougou Region, Woroba District.

Béréni-Dialla was a commune until March 2012, when it became one of 1126 communes nationwide that were abolished.

Notes

Former communes of Ivory Coast
Populated places in Woroba District
Populated places in Worodougou